Noel Teasdale (born 2 January 1938) is a former Australian rules footballer who played in the Victorian Football League (VFL) and the South Australian National Football League (SANFL).

Originally from Daylesford, Teasdale made his debut with the North Melbourne Football Club in 1956 playing as a ruckman and for a period, a full-back.

Teasdale was noted for his tough, uncompromising play and in 1964 this almost cost him his life – as his head clashed with that of North teammate Ken Dean leaving him in a serious condition in St. Vincent's Hospital. Midway through that same year, Teasdale came back to play for North, wearing a protective headguard due to medical advice. He also was the acting captain in the absence of injured skipper Allen Aylett.

The 1965 season saw Teasdale produce his best season yet – tying for the Brownlow Medal with Ian Stewart. Although he originally lost on countback, he was later awarded a retrospective medal in 1989.

His VFL career ended in 1967 and he later moved to Woodville Football Club, where he was captain-coach from 1968 to 1970, and non-playing coach in 1971. Later he coached West Torrens Football Club in 1975–76.

References

External links

150 Profiles: Noel Teasdale, Thomas Loftus (30 Sep 2019)
Honour Roll at kangaroos.com
MOST BEST AND FAIRESTS : Noel Teasdale (1963, 1964, 1965, 1966) at kangaroos.com

Australian rules footballers from Victoria (Australia)
North Melbourne Football Club players
1938 births
Living people
Brownlow Medal winners
Syd Barker Medal winners
Woodville Football Club players
Woodville Football Club coaches
West Torrens Football Club coaches
Australian Football Hall of Fame inductees
All-Australians (1953–1988)
Daylesford Football Club players